Themar is a town in the district of Hildburghausen, in Thuringia, Germany. It is situated on the river Werra, 11 km northwest of Hildburghausen, and 14 km southwest of Suhl.

Main sights 

 St. Bartholomew's Church, Themar
 St. John's Church
 Defensive wall
 Town hall
 Market place

Notable people 
 Karl Blau (1930–1994), politician and official of the NDPD

References

Literature and film 
 Themar – Stadt der 7 Türme, Documentary (2010), Directed by: Robert Sauerbrey
 

Hildburghausen (district)
Duchy of Saxe-Meiningen